Tytthoberis is a genus of flies in the family Stratiomyidae.

Species
Tytthoberis cuprea (Hutton, 1901)

References

Stratiomyidae
Brachycera genera
Diptera of Australasia